SMK Sultan Abdul Samad is a coeducational secondary school in Petaling Jaya, Malaysia. It is situated on a site of 11,041 hectares (so big?), located besides the road 12/13. The school has been described by Malaysiakini as "a premier institute in the country."

History
This school was officially opened on 27 May 1963 by the then Minister of Education Hussein Onn, who went on to become the prime minister of the nation a few years later.

Organization

Year structure
The school consists of five years; Form 1 to Form 5. As of 13 March 2014, Form 6 (lower six and upper six) education was terminated and all Form 6 students were moved to SMK Desa Petaling, Kuala Lumpur; since the number of students enrolling in the sixth form has been dropping.

Administration
 Zarina Binti Awang, Headmistress
 Premala Jacob, Senior Assistant
 Hamimah Binti Hasan, Head of Student Affairs
 Siti Sarah Binti Mohd Yunos, Co-curriculum Administrator

Notable alumni
Two students from the school were awarded 'Certificates of Excellence' for scoring 100% in the Australian National Chemistry Quiz 1999. Just 72 Certificates were awarded from an international entry of 103,760 students. In the 1998 competition, one student from the school won a 'Certificate of Excellence' when just 38 were awarded from 97,402 contestants.

Vishakan Kandiah won the Vision 2020 in Essay Writing Competition, in October 2005, organised by HELP University College. In his presentation he stated that "mediocrity must be rejected at all costs" and is of the view that the public apathy that exists among Malaysians accounts in part for the lack of progress in the nation.

Extra-curricular activities
The school won the Under-15 title in the first National Junior Scrabble Championship held in 1999.  The school won the first place in Football Under-18 MSSD competition in 2015.The school also won the cricket MSSD competition in 2015.The school also won the MSSD Festari dance competition 2015.The school won RM2000 from the green innovation competition and RM1500 in a competition in Universiti Malaya.

See also 
 List of schools in Selangor

References

External links
 

Educational institutions established in 1971
1971 establishments in Malaysia
Petaling Jaya
Secondary schools in Malaysia
Publicly funded schools in Malaysia
Schools in Selangor